Omicron Alpha Tau was an historically Jewish fraternity founded in 1912. It merged with Tau Delta Phi in 1934.

History
Omicron Alpha Tau was founded at Cornell University in the Spring of 1912. No intention at this time was made to forming a Greek Letter Fraternity which would develop into a national. Founders were: 
 Joseph Seidlin
 James Castelle
 Jack Grossman
 Benjamin Brickman
 Nat Shiren
 Jules Jokel
 Abraham Haibloom

The fraternity remained a local fraternity until 1915 when David Browman founded a second chapter at the College of Dental and Oral Surgery of New York.

Growth continued through New York, extending to eastern and southern schools.  Its first Midwest chapter was established in 1924 at Valparaiso. An international branch at McGill in Montreal was established in 1927 as Rho chapter, with additional Midwestern chapters established at Illinois and Chicago, also in 1927. The Marquette chapter was formed in 1928 as the Fraternity's Upsilon chapter. This Marquette unit may have been the last chapter formed; Baird's notes "at least 18 chapters were installed", ending its list with Upsilon, but the 1930 edition of The Illio notes there were 21 chapters as of its publication.

Baird's notes that several chapters died in the early Depression, predicating national dissolution. In 1934, Tau Delta Phi absorbed the chapters at Rutgers, NYU, Marquette and Cornell. The chapter at Syracuse was absorbed by Phi Epsilon Pi and the chapter at the University of Pennsylvania by Phi Beta Delta.

Symbolism and traditions 
The colors of the Fraternity were orange and blue.

The Fraternity's flower was the Goldenrod.

Omicron Alpha Tau was particularly known for their houses having adherence to traditional Jewish dietary laws. Several chapters maintained kosher kitchens. It was known at Cornell as "the most Jewish of fraternities."

One of the songs of the Fraternity was Onward Our O.A.T.:
Onward our O.A.T.
Forever onward greater to be,
For with the Orange and Blue
Leading sons ever true
We fear no adversity.
Lead us, Oh, Orange and Blue
Oh lead us on to honor you,
For where'er your sons may be,
We shall always fight for thee,
Oh, Onward Our O.A.T.

Magazine
The Fraternity's magazine, as of 1923, was called the OAT Digest and was distributed monthly. Later, the magazine's name was changed to The Oath issued three times a year.

Conventions
9th - Milwaukee, Wisconsin - April 28, 1935

Honorary members
David Sarnoff

Chapter list
The Chapters of Omicron Alpha Tau include:

Notes

See also
 List of Jewish fraternities and sororities

References

Defunct former members of the North American Interfraternity Conference
Student organizations established in 1912
Historically Jewish fraternities in the United States
1912 establishments in New York (state)
Jewish organizations established in 1912